Ouachita National Recreation Trail is a  long, continuous hiking trail through the Ouachita Mountains
of Oklahoma and Arkansas. It is the longest backpacking trail in the Ouachita National Forest, spanning 192 miles across its length. Approximately 177 miles of the trail is in Arkansas and 46 miles of the trail is in Oklahoma.
The trail is used by hikers, backpackers, hunters, and mountain bikers. It is a non-motorized single track trail open only to foot traffic and partially open to mountain bicycles. Segments opened to mountain bikes are from the western terminus of the Ouachita Trail at Talimena State Park to the Big Cedar trailhead on US Highway 259 at approximately Mile Marker (MM) 30.5 in Oklahoma, and from the Talimena Scenic Drive Trailhead at MM 54.1, east to Highway 7 at mile 160.4, north of Jessieville, Arkansas.

General information
The trail's western end is at Talimena State Park in southeastern Oklahoma, and the eastern end is at Pinnacle Mountain State Park in the small community of Natural Steps, Arkansas in central Arkansas. The first  lie within the Ouachita National Forest; the remaining , maintained by Pinnacle Mountain State Park, traverse lands owned by timber companies and Central Arkansas Water. The trail passes through parts of eight counties in Arkansas and one in Oklahoma. From east to west they are Pulaski, Perry, Saline, Garland, Montgomery, Yell, Scott, and Polk, in Arkansas, and Le Flore County in Oklahoma, where the trail ends. At several locations the trails switches back between two counties. Scott County actually has very little of the trail, with a couple of small corners of the county traversed.

There are two federally designated wilderness areas that the Ouachita Trail passes through: the Flatside Wilderness Area in Perry and Saline Counties in Arkansas and the Upper Kiamichi River Wilderness Area in Le Flore County, Oklahoma.

The Friends of the Ouachita Trail is a volunteer group devoted to maintaining the trail. (https://friendsoftheouachita.org/wp/)

While well-maintained, the trail is lightly used.  In a ranking of U.S. long-distance trails on a number of criteria by Backpacker Magazine,  the trail ranked third for solitude and fourth for signage.

Because of the low elevations and southern latitude, the best times
to hike the trail are the early spring and late autumn; winter months are
often warm enough, also. In July to September, the weather tends
to be too hot to hike comfortably, and water access points tend to dry up.

The trail meets the 37.8-mile Womble Trail north of the community of  Story, Arkansas. [1]

Big Maumelle River, AR 300 Truss Bridge

In the 1920s, a one-lane truss bridge was built on the old Highway 300 to cross the Big Maumelle River. It is on the list of Historic Bridges of the United States (Maumelle River AR 300 Bridge) for Pulaski County, Arkansas. The bridge still stands in the shadow of Pinnacle Mountain, but was made obsolete by a new bridge in 1981.

History and development

The Title of "Father of the Ouachita Trail" is given to Mr. Arthur P. Cowley, a former Public Information Officer of the Ouachita National Forest. Mr. Cowley graduated from the University of Missouri with a BS degree in Forestry and began working for the US Forest Service in 1954. Also he received a Master's Degree in Education from the University of Arkansas in 1978. In the early 1970s Mr. Cowley was instrumental in developing the Forest Service's plan for the Ouachita Trail. As a Recreation Staff Specialist with the US Forest Service in Hot Springs, he assisted in the first phases of construction of the Ouachita Trail. He handled trail planning and coordination of trail construction on the forest from 1965 until 1979 when he moved to California as Public Information Officer and later became the Big Tree Coordinator for the Sequoia National Forest.

During his time in Arkansas, Mr. Cowley served as President of the Society of American Foresters, 1977-78 President of the Arkansas Recreation and Parks Association and Vice Chairman of the Arkansas Trails Council. He also helped formulate Training Resources in Environmental Education (TREE) and received numerous awards, including the 1974 Arkansas Wildlife Federation's "Forester of the Year" award. He retired from the US Forest Service in 1988.

Mr. Cowley died on Mar 4, 2010, just one year prior to the 40th anniversary of the completion of the initial sections and opening of the trail. An Arkansas Trails Day event was held at the original Eastern Terminus at Lake Sylvia Trailhead in Perry County, Arkansas on Saturday, May 7, 2011.  Mr. Cowley's contributions were honored with a bench and plaque. His surviving wife Maureen and numerous family members were in attendance.

Construction of the trail began in May 1971 and was completed by 1981.  Mr. Jim Rawlins completed the first documented through hike of the Ouachita Trail in 1983. He also authored the first trail guide "A Hiker's Guide to the Ouachita National Recreation Trail.".

Points on the trail
 Talimena State Park
 Talimena Scenic Drive (Oklahoma State Highway 1)
 Upper Kiamichi River Wilderness
 Winding Stair Mountain National Recreation Area
 Queen Wilhelmina State Park
 U.S. Route 71
 Big Brushy Recreation Area
 U.S. Route 270
 Iron Springs Recreation Area
 Arkansas State Highway 27
 Arkansas State Highway 7
 Flatside Wilderness
 Lake Sylvia Recreation Area
 Arkansas State Highway 9
 Lake Maumelle
 Arkansas State Highway 10
 Lunsford Corner, AR
 Arkansas Highway 300
 Pinnacle Mountain State Park
 Natural Steps, Arkansas

Shelters along the trail 

The nine original shelters along the eastern portion of the trail were built by the United States Forest Service (USFS) in the 1980s and 1990s.
In 2013, Friends of the Ouachita Trail (FoOT) embarked on a program to build additional shelters along the remainder of the trail, with a goal of having shelters evenly spaced throughout.

See also
Long-distance trails in the United States

References 
Notes

 http://www.fs.usda.gov/Internet/FSE_DOCUMENTS/stelprdb5084303.pdf
 http://friendsot.org/wp-content/uploads/TR-01DETAIL_ONRTSegmentMapsa_000.pdf
 http://www.ouachitamaps.com/OT.html
 http://www.backpacker.com/trips/oklahoma/oklahoma-arkansas-s-ouachita-trail/
 http://friendsot.org/trail_shelter_project.htm
 http://www.fs.usda.gov/Internet/FSE_DOCUMENTS/fsm9_039448.pdf

External links
 Map from Friends of the Ouachita Trail
 Friends of the Ouachita Trail
 Ouachita Maps
 
 Ouachita Trail Backpacking Guide, Volume 1
 Ouachita Trail Backpacking Guide, Volume 2

National Recreation Trail
Protected areas of Garland County, Arkansas
Hiking trails in Oklahoma
Hiking trails in Arkansas
Protected areas of Le Flore County, Oklahoma
Long-distance trails in the United States
Protected areas of Montgomery County, Arkansas
National Recreation Trails in Arkansas
National Recreation Trails in Oklahoma
Protected areas of Perry County, Arkansas
Protected areas of Polk County, Arkansas
Protected areas of Pulaski County, Arkansas
Protected areas of Saline County, Arkansas
Protected areas of Scott County, Arkansas
Protected areas of Yell County, Arkansas
Ouachita National Forest